For Whom He Tolls is the 2009 psychological drama directed by Randal Reeder. The film stars Lena Clark, Gina Brazell, Lije Sarki, Angela Ware and George Wilson.  The project was executive produced by Kent Fuselier and Patti Chavez.  The film was shot almost concurrently during the remake of Boggy Creek, being shot in neighboring Uncertain, Texas and the theatrical filming of the movie Bernie in Carthage, starring Matthew McConaughey, a native of nearby Longview, Texas, Richard Linklater, Shirley Mclain, and Jack Black.

The film received awards in the Honolulu International Film Festival as well as in the Mexico International Film Festival.

External links
 

2009 films
2000s psychological drama films
2009 drama films
2000s English-language films